George Alfred Robison (February 14, 1931 – August 6, 2016) was an American football guard who played for the Dallas Texans. He played college football at Virginia Military Institute, having previously attended Piedmont in Piedmont, California.

References

1931 births
2016 deaths
American football guards
VMI Keydets football players
Dallas Texans (NFL) players
Players of American football from Missouri
People from Jackson County, Missouri